Carabus hummeli jurgae is a subspecies of ground beetle in the subfamily Carabinae that is endemic to Russia. They are black coloured with blue pronotum.

References

hummeli jurgae
Beetles described in 1995
Endemic fauna of Russia